Pilchowice  is a village in Gliwice County, Silesian Voivodeship, in southern Poland. It is the seat of the gmina (administrative district) called Gmina Pilchowice.

The village has a population of 2,919.

References

Villages in Gliwice County